Naomy Boudreau-Guertin (born 21 September 1999) is a Canadian freestyle skier who competes internationally in the aerials discipline.

Career
Boudreau-Guertin joined the national team in 2021.  Boudreau-Guertin had an eighth-place finish at the Deer Valley stop of the World Cup, the last stop before the 2022 Winter Olympics.

On January 24, 2022, Boudreau-Guertin was named to Canada's 2022 Olympic team.

References

External links 
 

1999 births
Living people
Canadian female freestyle skiers
Skiers from Quebec City
Freestyle skiers at the 2022 Winter Olympics
Olympic freestyle skiers of Canada